Crafty, real name Victor Eugène Géruzez ( in Paris –  in Saint-Martin-de-Nigelles) was a French comic writer and illustrator, specialising in books about horses and hunting on horseback.

Biography 
He was the son of Nicolas Eugène Géruzez and Désirée-Antoinette Sales. He was married on 7 March 1874 in Paris, to Louise Marguerite Gabrielle Vavin, the daughter of Alexis Vavin. They had two children, Claire Hélène and Jean Pierre Eugène.

He studied under Charles Gleyre, and exhibited at the Salon de Paris from 1877. 

His drawings were first published in Le Centaure, a review established by Léon Crémière, who also published his first two books, Snob à Paris and Snob à l'exposition ("Snob at the Paris Exposition").

He was a contributor to several reviews, newspapers and periodicals including Le Journal Amusant, La Vie Parisienne, L'Éclipse, Graphic, L’Esprit Follet, and Le Journal Pour Rire. 

He provided many of the illustrations for Les Chats by Champfleury (1870) and Enfants by Alphonse Daudet (1873). He also illustrated a book by his brother Paul.

Originals of his work are highly sought.

Works 

 
 
 , with a preface by Gustave Droz
 
 
 
 
 
 
 
 
 
 
 
 Album Crafty. Croquis parisiens (below)
  Illustrated by Crafty.

References

Sources

External links 

 , illustrations on the HeidICON website

19th-century French illustrators
French children's book illustrators
Natural history illustrators
Pseudonymous artists
1840 births
1906 deaths
Hunting in art